The National University of Córdoba is an institution of higher education in the city of Córdoba, Argentina.

Founded in 1613, the university is the oldest in Argentina, the third oldest university of the Americas, with the first university being the National University of San Marcos (Peru, 1551) and the second one, Saint Thomas Aquinas University (Colombia, 1580).

Since the early 20th century it has been the second largest university in the country (after the University of Buenos Aires) in terms of the number of students, faculty, and academic programs. As the location of the first university founded in the land that is now Argentina, Córdoba has earned the nickname La Docta (roughly translated, "The Wise"). The National University of Córdoba is financially supported by Argentinian taxpayers, but - like all Argentine national universities - it is autonomous. This means it has the autonomy to manage its own budgets, elect its own administration, and dictate its own regulations. Similar to that of most public universities in Argentina, admission to undergraduate study at the University of Córdoba is not selective. The only requirement is that applicants pass a leveling course test with a score higher than 4, which is equivalent to getting 60% of correct answers.

History

The Jesuit Era

In 1610 the Society of Jesus founded the Collegium Maximum in Córdoba, which was attended by students of the order. An institution of the highest intellectual caliber for the time, this was the precursor of the university. While still under the control of the Jesuits, and during the administration of the Bishop of Tucumán, Juan Fernando de Trejo y Sanabria, advanced studies began to be offered at what was now known as the Colegio Maximo de Córdoba. The school did not yet have authority to confer degrees. This milestone would be soon reached; on August 8, 1621 Pope Gregory XV granted this authority by an official document, which arrived in the city in April 1622. With this authorization, and with the approval of the church hierarchy and the provincial head of the Jesuits, Pedro de Oñate, the university began its official existence. This also marks the beginning of the history of higher education in Argentina.

The Jesuits remained in control of the university until 1767, when they were expelled by order of King Carlos III. Leadership then passed to the Franciscan order. For the first 150 years after its founding, the university maintained an exclusive focus on philosophy and theology. The first secondary school in Cordoba was Our Lady of Monserrat, founded by a Jesuit priest, Father Ignacio Duarte y Quirós, in 1687 and incorporated into the university's aegis in 1907. The College of Monserrat, as well as the original physical plant of the university and the Jesuit church, are part of the Jesuit Block, and were declared a World Heritage Site by UNESCO in 2000.

At the end of the 18th century, law studies were added (with the creation of the School of Law and Social Sciences), and from this time forward studies at the university were no longer exclusively theological. Following a conflict between the Franciscans and the secular clergy over the direction of the university, the house of study was renamed (by royal decree) to Royal University of Saint Charles and Our Lady of Monserrat. With this new name the university acquired the double title of Royal and Pontifical, and Monsignor Gregorio Funes was appointed president. With these changes, the Franciscans were replaced by the secular clergy as leaders of the university.

Post-Jesuit Era

Monsignor Funes was the architect of profound reforms in studies and introduced new subjects. On May 25, 1810, the May Revolution began, and the new regime took control of the University of Córdoba, although Monsignor Funes remained in his post. In 1820 the university was relocated in other parts of the province of Córdoba, due to a situation of disorganization and chaos across the nation. Around the middle of the 19th century, a new national constitution was ratified, which outlined the new framework for the political organization of Argentina. At this time there were two provincial universities in the country: one in Córdoba and one in Buenos Aires (founded in 1821). The former was nationalized in 1856, the latter in 1881, leaving both under control of the national government.

Between 1860 and 1880, many academic reforms were instituted, similar to those occurring at other universities around the world. In 1864 theological studies were finally eliminated. During the presidency of Faustino Sarmiento the sciences gained momentum through the recruitment of foreign lecturers specializing in Mathematical-Physical Science, leading to the opening of the School of Exact, Physical, and Natural Sciences. This period also saw the birth of the Academy of Exact Sciences and the Astronomical Observatory. In 1877 the School of Medicine was opened. In 1885 the Law of Avellaneda, the first law pertaining to universities, was passed, laying out the ways in which the bylaws of the national universities could be amended, and their administrative framework, leaving other matters under the control of the universities themselves. In 1886 the bylaws of the university in Córdoba were modified to conform to the new law.

The Reform of 1918

In June 1918 the student body at the university of Córdoba launched a movement, to which others all around the continent soon lent their voices, to fight for genuine democratization of the nation's academic activities. Hitherto controlled by interests related to the Catholic Church and the conservative lawmakers tied to the landed gentry, universities in Argentina gained unprecedented autonomy following these reforms.

The Cordobazo Uprising
In May 1969 a series of socio-economic events, closely connected to the French May (which had occurred exactly one year earlier), and with participation by students of the university as well as by workers of the middle and lower classes, led to changes in the educational and political strategies of the university. During the 20th century a number of new schools were created within the university, most of which began as institutes or departments within existing schools: the School of Philosophy and the Humanities, the School of Economics, the School of Architecture and Urban Studies (with Design added later), the School of Dentistry, the School of Chemistry, the School of Agriculture, and the School of Mathematics, Astronomy, Physics and Computing. Also created were the College of Languages (which later became a School) and the Manuel Belgrano College of Business.

Recent events
In 2005 tensions erupted among the teaching staff, involving forceful tactics such as strikes and large-scale demonstrations in the city streets by students, faculty and citizens unaffiliated with the university, as demands were made for fairer pay and the cost of living increases required by law. As the year progressed some agreements were reached but the situation remains unresolved and protests continue.

At the University Assembly which took place on December 16, 2006, Dr. Carolina Scotto was elected president for the period of 2007 through 2010, becoming the first woman chosen to direct this institution. She was inaugurated on April 25, 2007.

Faculties
Faculty of Agriculture
Faculty of Architecture, Planning and Design
Faculty of Arts
Faculty of Chemistry
Faculty of Communication Sciences
Faculty of Dentistry
Faculty of Economics
Faculty of Exact, Physical and Natural Sciences
Faculty of Languages
Faculty of Law
Faculty of Mathematics, Astronomy, Physics and Computing
Faculty of Medicine
Faculty of Philosophy and Humanities
Faculty of Psychology
Faculty of Social Sciences

Affiliated Institutions of Secondary Education
National College of Monserrat
Manuel Belgrano School of Business

Other affiliated institutions
Astronomical Observatory of Córdoba (OAC)
National Clinical Hospital
National Maternity
Dental Clinic
Blood Laboratory
Museum of Paleontology and Anthropology
Academy of Sciences
Center for Advanced Studies
Instituto de Astronomía Teórica y Experimental (IATE)
Botanical Museum of Córdoba

Departments and services
Steps: Healthcare system for university students
Athletic Department: Offers students opportunities to participate in sports and other physical activities, primarily on campus
University Dining Services: Operates during the academic year and offers meals from Monday through Friday, with three daily menus overseen by a nutrition specialist
Career Assistance: Specialized staffpeople provide counseling to students and prospective students on planning for a professional career, and on academic matters
Grants: Grant programs funded by the national government and by contributions from students of the university
Main Library: Includes more than 150,000 manuscripts and periodicals from the 19th century

Campus
The main campus is located in the center of the city, made up of 23 buildings for classes and cultural activities. In 1952, a more spacious campus, the "University City" (Spanish: Ciudad Universitaria) was established in the southern part of Córdoba city. The university also owns other campuses, notably, an experimental agricultural station located 20 km southeast of Córdoba city, and an astronomic observatory, among others.

Rankings 

In 2017, Times Higher Education ranked the university within the 801-1000 band globally.

Notable alumni
 Noemí Goytia (graduated 1963), architect, professor
 Laura Matusevich, mathematician
 Martin Uribe, Columbia University economist
 Sandra Díaz, ecologist
 Gabriela González, physicist

See also
 Jesuit Block and Estancias of Córdoba
 Channel 10 - Córdoba
 Argentine Universities
 University Revolution
 List of colonial universities in Latin America
 List of Jesuit sites

Further reading
Hernán Ramírez, La Universidad de Córdoba. Socialización y reproducción de la elite en el período colonial y principios del independiente, Córdoba, Ferreyra Editor, 2002.

References

External links

National University of Córdoba
Science and Education in Argentina

 
1613 establishments in the Spanish Empire
Cordoba
Buildings and structures in Córdoba, Argentina
Educational institutions established in the 1610s
Universities in Córdoba Province, Argentina